Thubana heylaertsi is a moth in the family Lecithoceridae. It was described by Snellen in 1903. It is found on Java.

The wingspan is 17–18 mm. The forewings are dark brown with dark yellow markings. The hindwings are blackish-grey with a round yellow mark at the tip, marked by a black fleck.

References

Moths described in 1903
Thubana